The A417 is a main road in England running from Streatley, Berkshire to Hope under Dinmore, Herefordshire. It is best known for its section between Cirencester and Gloucester where it has primary status and forms part of the link between the major settlements of Swindon and Gloucester.

History 
When the A417 was first designated in 1922, it ran only from Streatley to Cirencester.  In 1935 it was extended to Gloucester, on the former route of the A419, and on to Ledbury and Hope under Dinmore.

There have been numerous upgrades and bypasses, particularly on the primary section. At Faringdon, its traditional route over Folly Hill and down through the market place has been blocked by the more recent development of the A420 and has been diverted to the south. The Birdlip bypass, opened in 1988, avoided a very steep (16%) gradient as the road descended the Cotswold Edge escarpment to Brockworth. 

On 31 December 2022, the 200-year old Air Balloon pub at Birdlip closed for the final time before demolition for the road to be upgraded.

Route

Streatley to Gloucester (M5)
The road runs north-west from Streatley at its junction with the A329 (between Reading and Wallingford) then turns west to Wantage, over the picturesque Berkshire Downs. In Wantage, it negotiates the market place (around King Alfred's statue). Soon after leaving Wantage it passes through East Challow village and runs north-west to Faringdon, via Stanford in the Vale. It leads on to Lechlade, where it crosses the River Thames at St. John's Bridge. It then runs past the Cotswold Water Park, through the bottleneck of Fairford to Cirencester and thence to Gloucester.

From the start of the Cirencester bypass to Gloucester, the A417 forms part of a major new dual-carriageway route (A419/A417) connecting the M4 (junction 15) with the M5 at Gloucester (junction 11A). The  Cirencester & Stratton Bypass opened on 9 December 1997. This route carries traffic between the ports of the south coast and the industrial Midlands. The  dual-carriageway north of Stratton to Nettleton Improvement opened on 16 January 1998. The roundabout at the end of this section often has congestion during peak hours. 

The  £2.4m single-carriageway Birdlip bypass opened in December 1988. This point, before the Air Balloon roundabout, has a grand vista of the Severn Valley. After the roundabout and the Air Balloon pub, the road turns sharply and there is a steep gradient. This is a bottleneck at peak times, and there are plans for a dual-carriageway section here.  These plans were listed within a roads expansion programme pledged during the government's 2014 Autumn Statement for delivery during the coming 5–8 years. The  £36m Brockworth Bypass opened in December 1995, and included the new junction 11a of the M5.

Gloucester (M5) to Hope under Dinmore

Through Gloucester, the road overlaps the A40 Gloucester northern bypass, and from the end of this bypass at a roundabout the road goes north-west through the village of Maisemore, past Hartpury College, then through the village of Hartpury. The A417 then passes through the twin villages of Corse and Staunton. It crosses the M50 Ross Spur motorway at junction 2, then meets the Ledbury bypass, where the road noticeably widens out, and has many large roundabouts. Between Gloucester and Ledbury there are many changes of speed limit. From Ledbury it goes west, overlapping the A438, then at a set of traffic lights known as the Trumpet crossroads, the A417 goes north-west along a more high-hedged, narrow road. It meets the A49 at a wide junction at Hope under Dinmore just south of Leominster.

Junctions

{| border=1 cellpadding=2 style="margin-left:1em; margin-bottom: 1em; color: black; border-collapse: collapse; font-size: 95%;" class="wikitable"
|- align="center" bgcolor="#00703C" style="color: #ffd200;font-size:120%;"
| colspan="3" | A417 (T) 
|- align="center"
| Northbound exits
| Junction
| Southbound exits
|- align="center"
| Ross A40, Ledbury (A417), Chepstow (A48)  Cheltenham A40, Tewkesbury, Bristol (M5)
| Elm Bridge Court
| Start of A417 (T)
|-align="center"
| Gloucester (A38)
| Corinium Avenue Roundabout
| Gloucester (A38)
|-align="center"
| Local routes
| Zoons Court Roundabout
| Local routes
|- align="center"
| The Midlands M5
| rowspan="2"| M5 J11A
| No exit or access
|- align="center"
| The South West Bristol (M5), Gloucester Business Park  Exit only
| The SOUTH WEST Bristol (M5)
|-align="center"
| Cheltenham, Stroud A46
| Primrose Vale
| Cheltenham, Stroud A46
|- align="center"
| Stow on the Wold A436, Oxford (A40), Cheltenham (East) (A435)
| Air Balloon Roundabout
| Stow on the Wold A436, Oxford (A40)
|- align="center"
| Cowley, Caudle Green, Brimpsfield
| Cowley Roundabout
| Cowley, Caudle Green, Brimpsfield
|-align="center"
| Syde, Winstone, Elkstone
| Winstone Junction
| Syde, Winstone, Elkstone
|-align="center"
| Daglingworth, Bagendon, Perrott's Brook
| Daglingworth Junction
| Stratton, Daglingworth, Bagendon, Perrott's Brook
|-align="center"
| Cirencester, Stow A429, Burford (B4425)
| Cirencester North Interchange
| Cirencester, Stow A429, Lechdale (A417)
|- align="center"
| Start of A417 (T)
| rowspan="2"| Cirencester South Interchange
| Access only
|- align="center"
|  Cirencester Industrial Area, Stroud A419  Exit only
| Road becomes A419 (T) to Swindon

See also
British road numbering scheme

References

Roads in England
Roads in Berkshire
Transport in Gloucestershire
Transport in Herefordshire
Roads in Oxfordshire